K. Krishna Mohan (born 21 August 1984) is an Indian track and field athlete who became the first Indian to break the 14 second barrier in 110 metre hurdles. He held the national record of 13.96 seconds for 110 meter hurdles, which was set at the 48th National Open Athletic Championship held in Kochi on 10 September 2008.

References

External links

People from Guntur
Indian male hurdlers
1984 births
Living people
Sport in Guntur
Athletes from Andhra Pradesh
21st-century Indian people